Al-Bayan Fi Tafsir al-Quran (The Elucidation of the Exegesis of The Qur'an and sometimes entitled The Prolegomena to the Quran) is a tafsir by the Shiite scholar Abu al-Qasim al-Khoei.

The book consists of Quranic sciences topics such as Miracle, Distortion (Tahrif) and also commentary of the opening verse (Al-Fatiha). The book is a compilation of the authors lectures at the theology school of Najaf. The book is inspired by Kalami subjects of the author's teacher Allameh Balaghi specially those mentioned in his book “Aalaelrahman”. The book has been cited by Sunni scholars.

Topics covered
 Introduction (brief explanation of commentation style)
 Miracle and magic
 Different recitation methods
 On the integrity of Quran
 Abrogation (naskh)

References

Shia tafsir